Weddel & Co BV v Commission (1992) C-54/90 is an EU law case, concerning the Commission of the European Union's official exercise of power.

Facts
Weddel & CO BV claimed that a Commission official should be allowed to give evidence before a national court concerning licences to import beef from the US and Canada. Weddel & CO BV had claimed an action for annulment of Regulation No 2806/87, which restricted the amount of beef it could import, and asked a Commission official give evidence that he had assured a Dutch authority that no ceiling would be imposed. The Commission denied the official authority to give evidence, alleging it could do this under the Staff Regulations, articles 17 to 19, on the ground that the same facts were pending in another case, Weddel v Commission. The Commission argued that the Staff Regulations article 17 prohibited officials disclosing confidential information obtained from third parties or disclosing to unauthorised persons any document or information not already made public.

Judgment
The Court of Justice held that the Commission official could be required to give evidence in the national court.

See also

European Union law

Notes

References

Court of Justice of the European Union case law